Skratch (born May 26, 1972) is an American pinstripe artist and metal fabricator best known for his work on TVs Overhaulin' and numerous shows on Hot Rod TV, among countless magazine features.

Early years
The grandson of an Oklahoma moonshine runner and the son of a 1950s pinstriper, Skratch started working on hot rods at age 16 in Fort Worth, Texas because it was in his blood.  Soon, he had established a money making business buying and selling used Camaro parts locally. With an ever growing appetite for cars, he soon started buying cars outside the city, fixing them up and selling them for profit. By the age of 20, he had rented his first shop and began modding 1950s Oldsmobiles and Chevrolets. After several years of struggling to make ends meet, Skratch shut down the shop and began trying his hand at the corporate 9 to 5 thing...but that just wasn't happening for him. So, at 26, he quit and moved to the West Coast – the U.S. capital of Hot Rods. He was sure that he would be able to make it in the car world there. Soon, his pinstriping talents were noticed by various builders at events, and his new career in L.A. was born...Skratch's Garage.

Skratch's Garage
As Skratch began to fabricate and pinstripe for various owners and builders, a following started to build. Soon, his work could be seen in national magazines from Rod & Custom to Ol’ Skool Rodz and from Lowrider Magazine to Burnout Magazine. An art form normally reserved for the old codgers of hot rodding now had a new young face – striping everything from hot rods and lowriders to choppers and refrigerators. When he wasn't hitting car shows or doing custom striping, he could be found in Skratch's Garage in Sun Valley, CA working on a growing list of metal fabrication projects and custom builds.

TV Appearances
Next up for Skratch was TV, where in 2004 he landed a reoccurring role as “the striper” on TLC's hit car makeover show Overhaulin’. The show's star Chip Foose was so impressed with his striping and his fabrication skills that he has been continuously invited back into 2007's season 5. From his success on Overhaulin’, the producers approached him to star in his own episode of Hot Rod TV on ESPN2. The Head Skratcher episode follows Skratch as he marries a Model A Roadster with a ’58 Cadillac, using nothing but parts he acquires in junk yards and through the classifieds. Starting with a drawing on a napkin, he immerses himself in building “the classic American Hot Rod.” The episode stretches his talents to new heights while the cameras roll, and sleep becomes a distant memory as he bounces between the Head Skratcher, striping shows in Japan and Germany, and season 5 of Overhaulin’. Skratch is hot! The Hot Rod TV episode featuring Skratch debuted in September to be the highest rated episode in the entire 20-episode season, the Head Skratcher was featured on the cover of the re-launch of Hot Rod Deluxe Magazine and in a spread in an upcoming issue of Rodders Journal, and Skratch and the car will be at SEMA in Las Vegas promoting the brand with several potential corporate brand partners.

Bell Helmets
In 2010 Skratch was tapped by Bell Helmets to apply his signature painting and striping abilities to their new Bell Custom 500 three-quarter helmet. The collaboration lead to more helmets and currently there are three helmets available with more in production for late 2012 availability.

Sources
 Speed Channel's Livin' the Low Life 
 Overhaulin' 
 IMDB 
 Motorcycle USA helmet review

External links
 Skratch's Garage
 Bell Helmet Video
 Bell Helmets

1972 births
American artists
Living people
Metalworkers
Vehicle modification people